Vietnamophryne inexpectata is a species of microhylid frog endemic to the Central Highlands of Vietnam. Its type locality is Kon Chu Rang Nature Reserve, Gia Lai Province, central Vietnam.

References

Vietnamophryne
Amphibians of Vietnam
Amphibians described in 2018